France Bélisle is a Canadian politician, who was elected mayor of Gatineau, Quebec in the 2021 Gatineau municipal election. She is the city's first female mayor.

Bélisle was educated in journalism at the University of Ottawa and Carleton University, Bélisle worked as a journalist and news director for Ici Radio-Canada Télé owned-and-operated station CBOFT-DT in Ottawa, Ontario until joining Tourisme Outaouais as its executive director in 2015. She left that role in 2021 to mount her campaign for mayor.

She campaigned on themes of transparency at Gatineau City Hall, as well as on the need for Gatineau to maintain and improve its collaboration and communication with Ottawa City Council. During the campaign she faced allegations that her leadership of Tourisme Outaouais had created a toxic work environment at the organization.

She was sworn in as mayor of the city on November 16, 2021.

References

French Quebecers
Living people
Journalists from Quebec
Mayors of Gatineau
Women mayors of places in Quebec
University of Ottawa alumni
Carleton University alumni
Canadian television journalists
Canadian women journalists
Year of birth missing (living people)